Chen Jianhua (Cantonese: Chan Geen Wah; born March 1956) is a Chinese politician who currently serves as Chairman of the Guangzhou People's Congress. He formerly served as Mayor of Guangzhou. Chen was appointed acting mayor on 20 November 2011 following the resignation of Wan Qingliang, and elected mayor on 11 January 2012.

Chen was born in Lufeng, Guangdong. He was at one point secretary to Guangdong party chief Xie Fei. He served as the party chief of Conghua while a member of the Guangzhou municipal Party Standing Committee, then head of the propaganda department of the Guangzhou party committee. He was then named party chief of Heyuan, before taking over as mayor of Guangzhou in 2011. On 26 January 2016, Chen Jianhua was elected the Chairman of the Standing Committee of the Guangzhou People's Congress.

References

1956 births
Living people
Mayors of Guangzhou
Politicians from Shanwei
People from Lufeng
Chinese politicians of Hakka descent
People's Republic of China politicians from Guangdong
Chinese Communist Party politicians from Guangdong